The Stewards Society (collectively referred to as The Stewards) is an anonymous, all-male service fraternity, often considered a secret society, at Georgetown University. The name collectively refers a handful of loosely organizationally tied groups that have existed since the Stewards Society's founding in the 19th century and its reorganization in the 1980s. The Stewards Society would remain largely unknown until 1988, when the group publicly announced themselves and claimed to have disbanded. The First Steward Society would still continue to operate until splitting in the 1990s, forming the Second Stewards Society and later the Third Stewards Society. The Second Stewards Society operates a charitable endowment that donates to Georgetown University and related student organizations, although the rest of the group's activities remain opaque to the public.

History

Predecessor Organizations (1800s–1982) 
A version of what the Stewards Society would become was first organized by students in the early 1800s as a component of Georgetown University's first student organization, a religious devotional society known as the Sodality of the Blessed Virgin Mary. The latter existed until 1970. In the late 1800s, alumnus John Agar, from Georgetown College's class of 1876, organized Steward alumni to buttress Georgetown University's precarious economic situation. As a result, soon after Georgetown's iconic Healy Hall was completed, its Alumni Association was founded, and an independent Board of Regents took on fund raising.

First Stewards Society (1982–1988) 
The Stewards were reorganized or refounded in 1982 as an all-male service group designed as a secret society. Manuel Miranda was among the founders and first leaders of this organization.

In fall 1987 the Stewards issued a letter detailing campus traditions to the incoming Freshman class; the letter included an image of a key, the society's logo. In February 1988, the First Stewards Society was publicized when it announced the members had disbanded. The group at the time was an all male society made up of students in leadership positions and advised by Rev. Joseph T. Durkin. Following this, a number of the former members abdicated their leadership positions, including the student government president and the editor-in-chief for The Hoya, due to a large amount of student backlash. John Courtin, an executive director for the Georgetown Alumni Association claimed to have been aware of the group but only claimed to have limited participation. Internal documents from the Stewards would refer to this period of time as "The Great Unpleasantness."

The Stewards would continue to operate in an atomized state until the mid-1990s when internal conflicts resulted in the group splitting. The First Steward Society would die out soon after.

Second and Third Stewards Society (mid-1990s – present) 
Following the internal split within the First Steward Society, the Second Stewards Society was formed. A 2000 copy of the group's bylaws were leaked to the Washington Post detailing that senior positions within the group were to be occupied by Jesuits or other Roman Catholic priests. Around this time, a group referring to themselves as the "Third Steward Society" would also form, claiming to be the direct successors to the original Steward group. Both groups would remain predominantly out of the public eye during this time. The Stewards were largely believed to have become defunct at this time until, in 2001, a member of the group published an article in the Georgetown Academy magazine explaining the organization and its objectives.

At some point, a clock was installed in Georgetown's Red Square with a plaque referencing a former member of the Stewards and displaying the two-key logo of the organization.

Steward Throat (2013) 
In 2013 an anonymous blogger going by the name "Steward Throat" would release a series of internal e-mails from the Stewards members. This included internal memos that a candidate for student government president was an undisclosed member of the Stewards. This exposé would result in the aforementioned candidate losing the election and increased scrutiny towards the organization and its financial activities. Additionally, the Stewards drew considerable criticism over an 'elitist' attitude and expressed desire to combat the left-leaning culture of the university. Following this, The Hoya would host reviews on the 2014 and 2015 candidates for student government positions, outing members of both the Second and Third Steward Societies. The Hoya would go on to mention how student government candidates would be approached by Steward members during their campaigns.

The White Rose (2020) 
In 2020 an anonymous group referring to themselves as the White Rose released the identities and personal information about members of the Stewards on Twitter. The group released a series of statements calling for transparency around secret organizations, would make cryptic posts regarding the Stewards, and called for a university-wide ban on secret societies participating in student government. A spokesman for the Stewards would dismiss the group as spreading "old paranoia and distorted stories" and announced the actions of the White Rose were a violation of DC cyberstalking and harassment laws, as well as a violation of university guidelines. The White Rose would be loosely compared to Steward Throat. In response to the White Rose, the Second Stewards Society would release a statement clarifying their organization and its structure.

Structure and activities 
The Second Stewards Society operates as an anonymous service fraternity, claiming to be a private association and not a secret society. Furthermore, in 2020, the Second Stewards Society stated that they were not designated as a student group, instead calling themselves an alumni association. The Second Stewards Society has compared themselves to the Sulgrave Club and has stated that under NAACP v. Alabama and Roberts v. Jaycees, they operate within legal bounds. The organization claims to prefer to act with anonymity, not wanting members to be known publicly. The Second Stewards Society claims that members who are asked about participating in the organization are obligated to be truthful and must adhere to an ethical code.

Following the Steward Throat leak, financial documents were uncovered showing the group had a net assets of $147,000 and had predominantly donated to the campus's debate society, theater organization, and right-wing opinion journal. At the time of the White Rose leaks, the organization's endowment was estimated at 6 figures by The Hoya.

The Stewards have stated they played a major role in the funding and planning of a child care center at Georgetown University.

Reception 
During the disbanding of the First Stewards Society, the group drew considerable criticism from the student government, the student newspapers, and female students. The Stewards have been criticized as having "undertones of conservative religiousness, and.. anti-modern(ism)," and being seen as an effort to "manipulate student opinion and university agendas". Dean of Students John DeGioia stated "I don't believe that was my responsibility [in reference to the group disbanding], but I did make it clear to them that we do not tolerate the activities of a secret society on our campus." DeGioia would claim to have been previously approached by the organization but refused to offer them any support or formal recognition, as secret societies were a violation of university policy. The Stewards have contested these claims and claimed that their members include a range of religious and political identities; with the student body presidential candidate outed in 2013 identifying as a Jewish Democrat. Other criticisms against the organization include a lack of oversight and the pushing of propaganda toward new students.

See also 
 Collegiate secret societies in North America
 Skull and Bones (Yale University)
 Seven Society (University of Virginia)

References

External links 

 The Hoya- Stewards Archives

Secret societies
Georgetown (Washington, D.C.)
1982 establishments in the United States
Student organizations
Student organizations established in 1982
Georgetown University student organizations